Herbert Baddeley (11 January 1872 – 20 July 1931) was a British male tennis player and the younger of the Baddeley twins.

Herbert reached the singles semi finals at Wimbledon three times. In 1894 he beat Harry S. Barlow before losing to Ernest Lewis. In 1895 he beat Reginald Doherty before handing a walkover to his brother. In 1896 he beat William Larned before losing to Wilberforce Eaves. In 1891 and 1894–1896 he and his twin brother Wilfred won the Wimbledon doubles championship four times. When Wilfred was beaten in the 1896 singles Challenge Round by Harold Mahony, they both retired from lawn tennis to concentrate on their law career.

In February 1895 the brothers qualified in London as solicitors. They joined their uncle and father Thomas and E. P. Baddeley in Leadenhall Street at the family firm, founded by their great-grandfather in 1790. The brothers remained partners in the firm until 1919, when they retired leaving their cousin, Cyril Baddeley, to carry on in the family name. His daughter Violet Baddeley twice reached the final of the All England Open Badminton Championships in 1922 and 1927.

Grand Slam finals

Doubles (4 titles, 2 runner-ups)

References 

 

English male tennis players
English male badminton players
19th-century male tennis players
Wimbledon champions (pre-Open Era)
Tennis people from Greater London
English businesspeople
People from Bromley
Twin sportspeople
English twins
19th-century English people
1872 births
1931 deaths
Grand Slam (tennis) champions in men's doubles
British male tennis players